Kim Yong-sun (born February 21, 1991), better known by the stage name Solar, is a South Korean singer, songwriter, and actress signed under RBW. She is the leader and main vocalist of girl group Mamamoo and its sub-unit Mamamoo+. She made her solo debut with the single "Spit It Out" on April 23, 2020. She released her first extended play 容 : Face with its lead single "Honey" on March 16, 2022. Solar ventured into musical acting through the musical Mata Hari for its 2022 production on May 28, 2022, marking her first role as a musical actress.

Biography
Kim Yong-sun was born in Gangseo-gu, Seoul, South Korea, where she lived with her parents and elder sister, Yong-hee. She went to Hanyang Women's University with a major in tourism.

Career

2014–2018: Debut with Mamamoo

Solar debuted as a member and vocalist of Mamamoo on June 18, 2014, along with Moonbyul, Wheein, and Hwasa. She made a cameo appearance in the 2015 romance web drama Imaginary Cat as Jung Soo-In. On April 2, 2016, Solar was announced to be a part of We Got Married with Eric Nam and appeared in episode 316. The pair completed their last appearance on November 19, 2016, in episode 348. On December 29, 2016, she won 'Best Couple Award' at the 2016 MBC Entertainment Awards, marking her first variety show award as an entertainer. She was also nominated for 'Rookie Award (Female) in Variety Show' on the same night. On April 24, 2018, she released her first solo EP, Solar's Emotion, which included previously released covers of several Korean pop songs and her solo version of Mamamoo's "Star Wind Flower Sun," which she wrote herself.

2019–present: Solo activities
She made her official solo debut with the single, "Spit It Out," which was released with a music video on April 23, 2020. The same day, Solar had her debut stage on Mnet's M Countdown. On April 28, she won her first-ever music show award as a solo artist on SBS MTV's The Show.

On November 8, 2020, Solar joined Boss in the Mirror as 'Idol Boss' in episode 81 to 85. She returned as a fixed guest star and panelist for episodes 107 on May 9, 2021, and would subsequently guest star in the following episodes (107 to 109, 115 to 120, and 124 to 126). She became the photoshoot model for Men's Health magazine alongside fellow boss Yang Chi-seung. On May 12, 2021, it was announced that Solar joined Gummy, Lee Seung-chul, Bae Cheol-soo, Jung Jae-hyung, Kim Hyun-chul, and Winner's Kang Seung-yoon on KBS audition program 'The Song We Loved, New Singer' show as a judge, marking her first time as a judge in a singing/audition program. On July 20, 2021, it was announced that Solar joined JTBC's 'Poongryu - Battle Between the Vocalist' as a judge alongside Song Ga-in, Lena Park, Sung Si-kyung, Kim Jong-jin, Lee Juck, and 2PM's Jang Wooyoung. This marked her second time as judge for a singing competition. On December 25, 2021, Solar won her second award as an entertainer and first solo award as an entertainer as 'Best Entertainer in Show and Variety' at the 2021 KBS Entertainment Awards for her work in "The Legend, The New Singer” and “Boss in the Mirror.

On March 16, 2022, she released her first mini album 容 : Face and its lead single "Honey". 容 : Face has been met with positive critical acclaim from reviews. NME critic Rhian Daly gave the album a 4 out of 5 score, and stated "‘容 : FACE’ captures Solar’s energetic, bright and breezy personality well. The rap verse on ‘Honey’ is a particular highlight that showcases her dynamism, while the mini-album as a whole pops with little vocal details that subtly elevate the songs." In addition, Honey has been listed as one of the 'Best K-pop Track of 2022' by British magazine Dazed. Dazed stated "Solar often changes the sense of speed and atmosphere in the song, which further emphasizes the meaning of the lyrics written by Solar herself, doubling the feeling of challenge. It is a sweet yet bright and bold song."

On August 10, 2022, Solar was announced to join as Star Maker/Judge for JTBC's 'A Star Is Born' alongside Jung Jae-hyung, Sung Si-kyung, Jang Min-ho, Defconn, Yoo Se-yoon, and Kim Feel, marking her third time as a judge in a singing/audition competition.

In October 2022, Solar released the single "After Love" from the Casting in the Corner project with Yesung. The song was a remix of the 2006 version and was released on October 20.

On December 21, 2022, it was announced that Solar will be singing in the title song "Paradise" for Channel S' DJ Survival competition show 'WET!:World EDM Trend'. The song and music video will be released on December 28, 2022. "Paradise" is described as a song with an atmosphere that matches Solar's unique voice.

2022–present: Debut as musical actress
On April 6, 2022, EMK Musical announced that Solar will be starring in the 3rd season of the musical Mata Hari alongside Ock Joo Hyun as the titular character. The musical ran from May 28 to August 15, 2022.  Her performance as Mata Hari received acclamatory reviews from critics, highlighting her fresh take on the character, which emphasized the human side of Mata Hari who had a lot of scars. Subsequently, she brought her unique powerful vocal and refreshing energy, to express Mata Hari in her own way. One review stated that they were attracted to Solar's style, as her clear notes and drawn tones exceeded expectations, and she "tore up" the stage. In particular, Solar shined in Act 1 number "Become Mata Hari". In "Becoming Mata Hari", Solar delicately added Mata Hari's emotions to the oriental-style dance moves to steal the audience's attention. Another highlighted song was the final number of Act 2 "One Last Time" in which Mata Hari said goodbye to her loved ones, proved Solar's skill again as Mamamoo's main vocalist once again. Additionally, many critics could not believe it was her first musical, highlighting her strong presence by perfectly imitating Mata Hari; her explosive singing skills, colorful dance performances, and delicate emotions that "it's unbelievable it's her first musical challenge". For her performance in the musical, she was nominated for Best Newcomer Award (Female) at the 7th Korea Musical Awards on December 20, making this her first nomination as a musical actress.

Impact and Influence
Solar was ranked as the 18th most popular K-pop idol and 10th most popular K-pop idol 
according to Women in the age range of 19–29 years old in 2016 in annual surveys conducted by Gallup Korea. Additionally, she ranked 19th most popular K-pop idol in 2017 in the same surveys conducted by Gallup Korea.

Endorsements
On April 27, 2019, Solar was selected as Lipton's 5th Lipton Girl for their 'Iced Tea' Campaign. On April 22, 2020, Solar was selected as brand muse for beauty brand Blancow. She was chosen for her "clean skin" and "bright and lively energy" that go well with the brand image that pursues bare-faced confidence. On April 15, 2021, Solar renewed her contract with Blancow as an exclusive model. Solar's candid charms to pursue "bare-faced confidence", matched well with the image pursued by Blancow. It was considered positively that it brought about a synergistic effect. On May 14, 2021, Solar was selected as one of the musicians and content creator collaborating with Samsung to commemorate the launch of Samsung's Galaxy Book series with a 'Galaxy Live Quiz Show' (Gala Show), as well as promotional advertisements alongside fellow musician and content creator Gray. On April 25, 2022, Solar was selected as the face for 'New Gyeonggi-do Song' titled "Relaxing in Gyeonggi-do" by the Gyeonggi Province to support residents who are exhausted from the prolonged COVID-19 pandemic.

Discography

Extended plays

Single albums

Singles

As lead artist

Remakes

Collaborations

As featured artist

Soundtrack appearances

Other charted songs

Composition credits 
All song credits are adapted from the Korea Music Copyright Association's database unless stated otherwise.

Filmography

Television series

Television shows

Host

Radio shows

Theatre

Concerts
 Solar "Emotion Concert Blossom" (2018)
 April 27–29 – Seoul, South Korea – Ewha University
 June 16–17  – Busan, South Korea – Sohyang Theater Shinhan Card Hall

Awards and nominations

Notes

References

External links
 

1991 births
Living people
People from Seoul
Singers from Seoul
K-pop singers
South Korean women pop singers
South Korean female idols
South Korean television actresses
21st-century South Korean women singers
Mamamoo members